The Orange Springs Methodist Episcopal Church and Cemetery (also known as Orange Springs Community Church and Cemetery) is a historic church in Orange Springs, Florida. It is located at SR 315 and Church Street. On December 22, 1988, it was added to the U.S. National Register of Historic Places.

References

External links

 Marion County listings at National Register of Historic Places
 Marion County listings at Florida's Office of Cultural and Historical Programs

Methodist churches in Florida
National Register of Historic Places in Marion County, Florida
Churches on the National Register of Historic Places in Florida
Methodist cemeteries
Churches in Marion County, Florida
Cemeteries on the National Register of Historic Places in Florida